Thomas F. Proctor (born April 21, 1956, in Gilmer, Texas) is an American trainer of Thoroughbred racehorses who won the 1994 edition of the Breeders' Cup Distaff with One Dreamer. The son of trainer Willard Proctor, Thomas began his training career in 1978 at Hollywood Park Racetrack.

References

1956 births
Living people
American horse trainers
People from Gilmer, Texas